The Pilbara Craton is an old and stable part of the continental lithosphere located in the Pilbara region of Western Australia.

The Pilbara Craton is one of only two pristine Archaean 3.6–2.7 Ga (billion years ago) crusts identified on the Earth, along with the Kaapvaal Craton in South Africa. Both locations may have once been part of the Vaalbara supercontinent or the continent of Ur.

The eastern portion is called the Eastern Pilbara Craton.

Evidence of earliest life 
In May 2017, evidence of the earliest known life on land may have been found in 3.48-billion-year-old geyserite and other related mineral deposits (often found around hot springs and geysers) uncovered in the Dresser Formation in Pilbara Craton, leading some scientists to hypothesise that life first emerged on land in hot springs and only later colonised the ocean. The rocks of the Dresser Formation display evidence of haematite alteration that may have been microbially influenced.

The earliest direct evidence of life on Earth may be fossils of microorganisms permineralized in 3.465-billion-year-old Australian Apex chert rocks. However, the evidence for the biogenicity of these microstructures has been thoroughly debated. Originally, 11 taxa were described from a deposit thought to be located at the mouth of a river due to certain characteristics like rounded and sorted grains. Extensive field mapping and petrogenetic analysis has since shown the setting for the purported microfossils to be hydrothermal and this is widely supported. Consequently, many alternative abiotic explanations have been proposed for the filamentous microstructures including carbonaceous rims around quartz spherules and rhombs, witherite self-assembled biomorphs and haematite infilled veinlets. The carbonaceous matter composing the filaments has also been repeatedly examined with Raman spectroscopy which has yielded mixed interpretations of results and is therefore regarded by many to be unreliable for determining biogenicity when used alone. Perhaps the most compelling argument to date is based on high spatial resolution electron microscopy like scanning and transmission electron microscopy. This study concludes that the nano-scale morphology of the filaments and the distribution of the carbonaceous matter are inconsistent with a biological origin for the filaments. Instead, it is more likely that the hydrothermal conditions have assisted in the heating, hydration and exfoliation of potassium micas on which barium, iron and carbonate have secondarily been adsorbed.

Carbonaceous structures appearing to be of biological origin have also been discovered in the 3.47 billion year-old Mount Ada Basalt, a rock layer that is a few million years older than the Apex chert. However, the biogenicity of these supposed fossils has also been disputed, with some studies finding abiotic processes to be a more likely culprit for their formation.

Additional potential bioindicators from the Precambrian have been found in the region, including carbonaceous microfossils in the northeastern Pilbara Craton.

See also 

 Archaea
 Australian Shield
 Centralian Superbasin
 Gawler Craton
 Geology of Australia
 Ore genesis
 Perth Basin
 Western Plateau
 Yilgarn Craton

References

Bibliography

External links 

 Deformation and gold mineralisation of the Archaean Pilbara Craton, Western Australia
 Stratigraphic revision of the Warrawoona and Gorge Creek Groups in the Kelly greenstone belt, Pilbara Craton,Western Australia
 Tectonic/Volcanic Landforms

Cratons
Geology of Western Australia
Economic geology
Structural geology
Historical geology
Bornhardts
Physiographic sections
Pilbara